Margaret Heffernan (born 1955) is an American entrepreneur, CEO, writer and keynote speaker.

Margaret Heffernan may also refer to:
Margaret Heffernan (linguist) (born 1943), Australian linguist
Margaret Heffernan (Irish businesswoman) (born 1942), Irish businesswoman